Ernest Newton West (19 November 1907 – ?) was an Australian politician.

He was born at North Shields in Northumberland, England. In 1941 he was elected to the Tasmanian House of Assembly as a Labor member for Wilmot. He was defeated in 1946.

References

1907 births
Year of death missing
Members of the Tasmanian House of Assembly
Australian Labor Party members of the Parliament of Tasmania